Khirbet Beit Zakariyyah (variants: Beit Iskâria, Khirbet Zakariah, Beit Skâria) is a small Palestinian village southwest of Bethlehem in the West Bank, perched on a hill that rises about  above sea level. Administratively, it is associated with the village of Artas under the Bethlehem Governorate. It is also located in between the Israeli settlements of Alon Shevut and Rosh Tzurim, both of which were built on land confiscated from the village.

Location

History

The village may be the site of the Battle of Beth Zechariah between the Jewish Maccabeans and Selucid Greek forces during the Maccabean revolt against the Seleucid Empire, in the year 162 BCE.

Three rock-cut burial caves, dating to the 1st century BCE  have been excavated, and  pottery fragments from the 1st century BCE were found. Potsherds from the Roman and Byzantine era have also been found here.

In the Byzantine period an important church was located here, which appears on the Madaba map. Since then a mosque, going by the name Nabi-Zakariah, has been built on the site of the church. Some of the ruins of the church are preserved in the courtyard and roof of the mosque. In general, some of the houses in the village are built on top of ancient ruins and caves (among which is a columbarium).

During the   Crusader era,  Casale Zacharie, like nearby  al-Khidr, probably was a Christian village,  and it  was granted with al-Khidr to the church of  Bethlehem between c. 1155 and c. 1186.

Pottery  fragments from the Mamluk era have also been found.

Ottoman era

In 1852,  Edward Robinson  noted Beit Sakarieh “on an almost isolated promontory or  Tell, jutting out northwest between two deep valleys; and connected with the high ground south by a low neck between the heads of those two valleys."

An  Ottoman list from about 1870 notes a Muslim  wali, dedicated to a Sheikh Zakarja, located under a large tree. Several cisterns were also noted, and that the old  Roman road to Jerusalem passed by.

The PEF's Survey of Western Palestine visited in 1873 and noted:  "From the main Roman road on the south a path leads to this ruin, situate on the brow, overlooking deep valleys on the east and north. Beside the path is a square foundation about 50 feet side, of roughly-dressed stones. The remains on the hill-brow are those of a large modern village, with more ancient foundations.  One wall consists of stones 4 1/2 feet long, 2 feet high, roughly dressed. There is also a mosque, with a portico  on the west, sunk below the surface. On the north side of this portico a pillar is placed with a capital of basket-work (see illustration), like the eighth century Byzantine capitals. The shaft is 2 feet diameter. The mosque door was shut ; perhaps it may represent the site of the church which once stood at this place. [..] Drafted stones with a rough boss were also found, and another capital, apparently Byzantine. To the west of the site are rock-cut tombs, now blocked. A tree grows over the Mukam, or mosque."

French explorer Victor Guérin visited the village and described the ruins he saw around the village mosque:
A small mosque contains, they say, a tomb, which is no longer visible, buried as it is under rubble; it is believed to contain the venerated remains of Abu Zakaria. At the entrance of this sanctuary, I notice two columns which seem to come from a Byzantine church; the capitals, in fact, represent a sort of basket of rushes intertwined like the meshes of a net.

Gush Etzion settlement bloc

Between 1943 and 1948, four Jewish outpost settlements were built on the village land; the area became known as Gush Etzion (the "Etzion Bloc").

1948
On January 14, 1948, Arab forces led by Abd al-Qadir al-Husayni attempted to capture the strategic hill of Beit Zakariah, and thus to split Gush Etzion into two in preparation for its total conquest. However, Jewish forces defeated them in the Battle of 3 Shevat. The defeat had strategic implications for all of Palestine - as a result, Husseini cancelled his plans to attack Jewish communities, and focused on attacks on the roads.

Jordanian era
In the wake of the 1948 Arab–Israeli War, and after the 1949 Armistice Agreements, Khirbet Beit Zakariyyah came under Jordanian rule.

1967-present
Since the Six-Day War in 1967, Khirbet Beit Zakariyyah has been under Israeli occupation.

After the Oslo Accords in 1995, 100%  of  Khirbet Beit Zakariyyah land was classified  as Area C, under full Israeli control.

According to ARIJ, Israel has confiscated land from Khirbet Beit Zakariyyah in order to construct six Israeli settlements: 
920 dunams for Allon Shevut
780 dunams for Rosh Zurim
420 dunams for Kfar Etzion
144 dunams for Bat Ayin
45 dunams for Efrat
41 dunams for Migdal Oz

References

Bibliography
 
 
 
  
 
 

   

 
 
 
 (p. 166)

External links
Survey of Western Palestine, Map 17:  IAA, Wikimedia commons 
Beit Sakariya Village (Fact Sheet), Applied Research Institute–Jerusalem, (ARIJ)
Beit Sakariya Village Profile, ARIJ
Beit Sakariya aerial photo, ARIJ
The priorities and needs for development in Beit Sakariya village based on the community and local authorities’ assessment), ARIJ
 When Settlers Attack, Thejerusalemfund

POICA 
 Land Grab continues in Bethlehem District, March 9, 2004. POICA.
 Threats of House Demolitions in Beit Sakariya Hamlet, April 10, 2007. POICA.
 Israeli Occupation Plans to Destroy Khirbet Beit Skarya, September 3, 2010. POICA.
 Kherbit Beit Zakariya clobbered by the Israeli occupation Demolishing residential house and water wells, July 6, 2011. POICA.

Seam Zone
Villages in the West Bank
Bethlehem Governorate
Municipalities of the State of Palestine